Gwylog ap Beli  was one of the rulers of the Kingdom of Powys during the late 7th to early 8th Century, son of Beli ab Eiludd. There is also a small possibility his mother was Heledd ferch Cyndrwyn, the narrator of the Canu Heledd, as she would have been welcomed by his father Beli after the defeat at Maes Cogwy.

Monarchs of Powys
House of Gwertherion
7th-century Welsh monarchs
8th-century Welsh monarchs
Year of birth uncertain
725 deaths
7th-century births